Jozef Pastorek (born 26 September 1998) is a Slovak footballer who plays for Komárno as a midfielder.

Club career

FK Železiarne Podbrezová
Pastorek made his professional debut for FK Železiarne Podbrezová against Nitra on 16 February 2019.

References

External links
 FK Železiarne Podbrezová official club profile 
 
 Futbalnet profile 
 

1998 births
Living people
Slovak footballers
Association football midfielders
FK Železiarne Podbrezová players
KFC Komárno players
Slovak Super Liga players
2. Liga (Slovakia) players
Expatriate footballers in England
People from Nové Zámky
Sportspeople from the Nitra Region